Lüliang Dawu Airport  is an airport serving the city of Lüliang in Shanxi Province, China.  It is located near the town of Dawu in Fangshan County, 20.5 kilometers from the city center.  Construction of the airport began on 21 February 2009 with an investment of 764 million yuan, and was originally projected to be finished in 2011. The actual completion time was late 2013, and the airport was opened on 26 January 2014.

It was a notorious "ghost airport" around 2015; despite its size and cost, it handled just three to five flights per day.  By 2019, this number had grown to more than 17 flights per day.

Facilities
The airport will have one runway that is 2,600 meters long and 45 meters wide (class 4C), and a 13,000 square meter terminal building.  It is projected to handle 200,000 passengers and 900 tons of cargo annually by 2020.

Airlines and destinations

See also
List of airports in China

References

Airports in Shanxi
Airports established in 2014
2014 establishments in China